Mullukkurichi is a village in Namakkal district of Rasipuram Taluk in the Indian state of Tamil Nadu.

Mullukkurichi is located 60 km from the city of Namakkal. Villagers use buses to commute for business and personal work.

This parliament constituency comes under Namakkal. The famous Indian Aanjaneyar Temple is located 20 kilometres from the village.

References

Villages in Namakkal district